Richard Dodge may refer to:
 Richard Irving Dodge, United States Army officer
 Richard Staples Dodge, American illustrator